Kalomo District is a district of Zambia, located in Southern Province. The capital lies at Kalomo. As of the 2000 Zambian Census, the district had a population of 169,503 people.

References

Districts of Southern Province, Zambia